Statistics of Kuwaiti Premier League for the 1999–2000 season.

Overview
It was contested by 14 teams, and Al Salmiya Club won the championship.

League standings

Championship playoff

References
Kuwait - List of final tables (RSSSF)

1999–2000
1999–2000 in Asian association football leagues
1